The 1972 Open Championship was the 101st Open Championship, held 12–15 July at Muirfield Golf Links in Gullane, East Lothian, Scotland. Lee Trevino won his second straight Claret Jug, the first to successfully defend his title since Arnold Palmer in 1962. Trevino finished one stroke ahead of runner-up Jack Nicklaus, ending his bid for the Grand Slam. Nicklaus had won the first two majors in 1972 and was the odds-on favorite at Muirfield, where he won his first Open in 1966. He also held the PGA Championship title from February 1971; a win at Muirfield and he would become the first to hold all four major titles at once.

Six strokes back at even-par after 54 holes, Nicklaus shot a final round 66 (−5) on Saturday to tie the course record, but played the final three holes at one-over par. Trevino had posted his own 66 in the third round and held on in the fourth round with an even-par 71, which included a chip-in for par at 17, to gain the fourth of his six major titles.

It was the third of four times that Nicklaus was a runner-up to Trevino in a major championship.

Trevino's win concluded a stretch where American-born golfers won eight consecutive major championships. This is the fourth-longest stretch in history for American-born golfers after stretches that ended at the 1930 Open Championship, 1947 U.S. Open, and the 1977 PGA Championship.

Thirty years later, Tiger Woods became the first since Nicklaus to win the first two major tournaments of the year. His bid for a Grand Slam in 2002 also ended at Muirfield.

Past champions in the field

Made both cuts

Missed the first cut

Round summaries

First round
Wednesday, 12 July 1972

Second round
Thursday, 13 July 1972

Amateurs: Foster (+7), Mosey (+8), Revell (+9), Stephen (+9), Campbell (+11), Homer (+11), Gradwell (+13), Elson (+14), Bonallack (+15), Clark (+15), Berry (+19), Gray (+20).

Third round
Friday, 14 July 1972

Amateurs: Foster (+14), Mosey (+14), Stephen (+14), Revell (+15).

Final round
Saturday, 15 July 1972

Source:

References

External links
Muirfield 1972 (Official site)
101st Open Championship - Muirfield (European Tour)

The Open Championship
Golf tournaments in Scotland
Open Championship
Open Championship
Open Championship